Most Rev Jose Paala Salazar OP (March 13, 1937 - May 30, 2004 ) was a Filipino prelate of the Roman Catholic Church.

Biography
Salazar, born in Manila, Philippines, was ordained a priest on May 9, 1968, and consecrated bishop on April 25, 1996. Salazar was appointed Auxiliary Bishop of the Archdiocese of Lipa on June 11, 2003. He was the Titular Bishop of Hippo Diarrhytus.

On November 11, 2002, Salazar was one of 15 people to survive the crash of Laoag International Airlines Flight 585.

He died aged 67 in Lipa, Batangas.

References

1937 births
2004 deaths
Clergy from Manila
20th-century Roman Catholic bishops in the Philippines